Finn Creek is a stream in the U.S. state of Washington.

A large share of the first settlers were Finns, hence the name.

See also
List of rivers of Washington

References

Rivers of Pacific County, Washington
Rivers of Washington (state)